Bibiano is both a given name and a surname. Notable people with the name include:
Bibiano Fernandes (born 1980), Brazilian mixed martial artist
Bibiano Fernandes (born 1976), Indian footballer
Bibiano Ouano (1915–1960), Filipino basketball player
Bibiano Zapirain (1919–2000), Uruguayan footballer
Lucas Ribamar Lopes dos Santos Bibiano (born 1997), Brazilian footballer
Pedro de Alcântara João Carlos Leopoldo Salvador Bibiano Francisco Xavier de Paula Leocádio Miguel Gabriel Rafael Gonzaga (1825–1891), full name of Pedro II of Brazil, Brazilian monarch

Masculine given names